Fan Tai (355– 21 September 428), courtesy name Bolun, was an official who served under the Eastern Jin and Liu Song dynasties of China. His fourth son, Fan Ye, wrote the historical text Book of the Later Han.

References

 The Cambridge History of China, Volume 1, The Ch'in and Han Empires, 221 BC–AD 220 https://web.archive.org/web/20070927223220/http://www.cnread.net/cnread1/lszl/s/shenyue/ss/060.htm (Chinese only)

355 births
428 deaths
Jin dynasty (266–420) generals
Liu Song generals
Chinese educators
Jin dynasty (266–420) politicians
Liu Song politicians
Jin dynasty (266–420) essayists
Northern and Southern dynasties essayists
Liu Song writers